Allosaurus is a genus of large carnosaurian theropod dinosaur that lived 155 to 145 million years ago during the Late Jurassic epoch (Kimmeridgian to late Tithonian). The name "Allosaurus" means "different lizard" alluding to its unique (at the time of its discovery) concave vertebrae. The first fossil remains that could definitively be ascribed to this genus were described in 1877 by paleontologist Othniel Charles Marsh. As one of the first well-known theropod dinosaurs, it has long attracted attention outside of paleontological circles.

Allosaurus was a large bipedal predator. Its skull was light, robust and equipped with dozens of sharp, serrated teeth. Relative to the large and powerful hindlimbs, its three-fingered forelimbs were small, and the body was balanced by a long and heavily muscled tail. It is classified as an allosaurid, a type of carnosaurian theropod dinosaur.

The genus has a complicated taxonomy, and includes at least three valid species, the best known of which is A. fragilis. The bulk of Allosaurus remains have come from North America's Morrison Formation, with material also known from Portugal. It was known for over half of the 20th century as Antrodemus, but a study of the abundant remains from the Cleveland-Lloyd Dinosaur Quarry brought the name "Allosaurus" back to prominence and established it as one of the best-known dinosaurs.

As the most abundant large predator in the Morrison Formation, Allosaurus was at the top of the food chain, probably preying on contemporaneous large herbivorous dinosaurs, and perhaps other predators. Potential prey included ornithopods, stegosaurids, and sauropods. Some paleontologists interpret Allosaurus as having had cooperative social behavior, and hunting in packs, while others believe individuals may have been aggressive toward each other, and that congregations of this genus are the result of lone individuals feeding on the same carcasses.

Discovery and history

Early discoveries and research

The discovery and early study of Allosaurus is complicated by the multiplicity of names coined during the Bone Wars of the late 19th century. The first described fossil in this history was a bone obtained secondhand by Ferdinand Vandeveer Hayden in 1869. It came from Middle Park, near Granby, Colorado, probably from Morrison Formation rocks. The locals had identified such bones as "petrified horse hoofs". Hayden sent his specimen to Joseph Leidy, who identified it as half of a tail vertebra, and tentatively assigned it to the European dinosaur genus Poekilopleuron as Poicilopleuron  valens. He later decided it deserved its own genus, Antrodemus.

Allosaurus itself is based on YPM 1930, a small collection of fragmentary bones including parts of three vertebrae, a rib fragment, a tooth, a toe bone, and, most useful for later discussions, the shaft of the right humerus (upper arm). Othniel Charles Marsh gave these remains the formal name Allosaurus fragilis in 1877. Allosaurus comes from the Greek /, meaning "strange" or "different" and /, meaning "lizard" or "reptile". It was named 'different lizard' because its vertebrae were different from those of other dinosaurs known at the time of its discovery. The species epithet fragilis is Latin for "fragile", referring to lightening features in the vertebrae. The bones were collected from the Morrison Formation of Garden Park, north of Cañon City. Marsh and Edward Drinker Cope, who were in scientific competition with each other, went on to coin several other genera based on similarly sparse material that would later figure in the taxonomy of Allosaurus. These include Marsh's Creosaurus and Labrosaurus, and Cope's Epanterias.

In their haste, Cope and Marsh did not always follow up on their discoveries (or, more commonly, those made by their subordinates). For example, after the discovery by Benjamin Mudge of the type specimen of Allosaurus in Colorado, Marsh elected to concentrate work in Wyoming; when work resumed at Garden Park in 1883, M. P. Felch found an almost complete Allosaurus and several partial skeletons. In addition, one of Cope's collectors, H. F. Hubbell, found a specimen in the Como Bluff area of Wyoming in 1879, but apparently did not mention its completeness, and Cope never unpacked it. Upon unpacking in 1903 (several years after Cope had died), it was found to be one of the most complete theropod specimens then known, and in 1908 the skeleton, now cataloged as AMNH 5753, was put on public view. This is the well-known mount poised over a partial Apatosaurus skeleton as if scavenging it, illustrated as such by Charles R. Knight. Although notable as the first free-standing mount of a theropod dinosaur, and often illustrated and photographed, it has never been scientifically described.

The multiplicity of early names complicated later research, with the situation compounded by the terse descriptions provided by Marsh and Cope. Even at the time, authors such as Samuel Wendell Williston suggested that too many names had been coined. For example, Williston pointed out in 1901 that Marsh had never been able to adequately distinguish Allosaurus from Creosaurus. The most influential early attempt to sort out the convoluted situation was produced by Charles W. Gilmore in 1920. He came to the conclusion that the tail vertebra named Antrodemus by Leidy was indistinguishable from those of Allosaurus, and Antrodemus thus should be the preferred name because, as the older name, it had priority. Antrodemus became the accepted name for this familiar genus for over 50 years, until James Henry Madsen published on the Cleveland-Lloyd specimens and concluded that Allosaurus should be used because Antrodemus was based on material with poor, if any, diagnostic features and locality information (for example, the geological formation that the single bone of Antrodemus came from is unknown). "Antrodemus" has been used informally for convenience when distinguishing between the skull Gilmore restored and the composite skull restored by Madsen.

Cleveland-Lloyd discoveries

Although sporadic work at what became known as the Cleveland-Lloyd Dinosaur Quarry in Emery County, Utah, had taken place as early as 1927, and the fossil site itself described by William L. Stokes in 1945, major operations did not begin there until 1960. Under a cooperative effort involving nearly 40 institutions, thousands of bones were recovered between 1960 and 1965, led by James Henry Madsen. The quarry is notable for the predominance of Allosaurus remains, the condition of the specimens, and the lack of scientific resolution on how it came to be. The majority of bones belong to the large theropod Allosaurus fragilis (it is estimated that the remains of at least 46 A. fragilis have been found there, out of at a minimum 73 dinosaurs), and the fossils found there are disarticulated and well-mixed. Nearly a dozen scientific papers have been written on the taphonomy of the site, suggesting numerous mutually exclusive explanations for how it may have formed. Suggestions have ranged from animals getting stuck in a bog, to becoming trapped in deep mud, to falling victim to drought-induced mortality around a waterhole, to getting trapped in a spring-fed pond or seep. Regardless of the actual cause, the great quantity of well-preserved Allosaurus remains has allowed this genus to be known in detail, making it among the best-known theropods. Due to being one of Utah's two fossil quarries where many Allosaurus specimens have been discovered, Allosaurus was designated as the state fossil of Utah in 1988.

Recent work: 1980s–present
The period since Madsen's monograph has been marked by a great expansion in studies dealing with topics concerning Allosaurus in life (paleobiological and paleoecological topics). Such studies have covered topics including skeletal variation, growth, skull construction, hunting methods, the brain, and the possibility of gregarious living and parental care. Reanalysis of old material (particularly of large 'allosaur' specimens), new discoveries in Portugal, and several very complete new specimens have also contributed to the growing knowledge base.

"Big Al" and "Big Al II"

In 1991,  "Big Al" (MOR 693), a 95% complete, partially articulated specimen of Allosaurus was discovered. It measured about 8 meters (about 26 ft) in length. MOR 693 was excavated near Shell, Wyoming, by a joint Museum of the Rockies and University of Wyoming Geological Museum team. This skeleton was discovered by a Swiss team, led by Kirby Siber. Chure and Loewen in 2020 identified the individual as a representative of the species Allosaurus jimmadseni. In 1996, the same team discovered a second Allosaurus, "Big Al II". This specimen, the best preserved skeleton of its kind to date, is also referred to Allosaurus jimmadseni.

The completeness, preservation, and scientific importance of this skeleton gave "Big Al" its name; the individual itself was below the average size for Allosaurus fragilis, and was a subadult estimated at only 87% grown. The specimen was described by Breithaupt in 1996. Nineteen of its bones were broken or showed signs of infection, which may have contributed to "Big Al's" death. Pathologic bones included five ribs, five vertebrae, and four bones of the feet; several damaged bones showed osteomyelitis, a bone infection. A particular problem for the living animal was infection and trauma to the right foot that probably affected movement and may have also predisposed the other foot to injury because of a change in gait. Al had an infection on the first phalanx on the third toe that was afflicted by an involucrum. The infection was long-lived, perhaps up to six months. Big Al Two is also known to have multiple injuries.

Species

Six species of Allosaurus have been named: A. amplus, A. atrox, A. europaeus, the type species A. fragilis, A. jimmadseni and A. lucasi. Among these, Daniel Chure and Mark Loewen in 2020 only recognized the species A. fragilis, A. europaeus, and the newly-named A. jimmadseni as being valid species. However, A. europaeus does not show any unique characters compared to the North American species, so a reevaluation of its validity is required.

A. fragilis is the type species and was named by Marsh in 1877. It is known from the remains of at least 60 individuals, all found in the Kimmeridgian–Tithonian Upper Jurassic-age Morrison Formation of the United States, spread across the states of Colorado, Montana, New Mexico, Oklahoma, South Dakota, Utah, and Wyoming. Details of the humerus (upper arm) of A. fragilis have been used as diagnostic among Morrison theropods, but A. jimmadseni indicates that this is no longer the case at the species level.

A. jimmadseni has been scientifically described based on two nearly complete skeletons. The first specimen to wear the identification was unearthed in Dinosaur National Monument in northeastern Utah, with the original "Big Al" individual subsequently recognized as belonging to the same species. This species differs from A. fragilis in several anatomical details, including a jugal or cheekbone with a straight lower margin. Fossils are confined to the Salt Wash Member of the Morrison Formation, with A. fragilis only found in the higher Brushy Basin Member.

A. fragilis, A. jimmadseni, A. amplus, and A. lucasi are all known from remains discovered in the Kimmeridgian–Tithonian Upper Jurassic-age Morrison Formation of the United States, spread across the states of Colorado, Montana, New Mexico, Oklahoma, South Dakota, Utah and Wyoming. A. fragilis is regarded as the most common, known from the remains of at least 60 individuals. For a while in the late 1980s and early 1990s, it was common to recognize A. fragilis as the short-snouted species, with the long-snouted taxon being A. atrox; however, subsequent analysis of specimens from the Cleveland-Lloyd Dinosaur Quarry, Como Bluff, and Dry Mesa Quarry showed that the differences seen in the Morrison Formation material could be attributed to individual variation. A study of skull elements from the Cleveland-Lloyd site found wide variation between individuals, calling into question previous species-level distinctions based on such features as the shape of the lacrimal horns, and the proposed differentiation of A. jimmadseni based on the shape of the jugal. A. europaeus was found in the Kimmeridgian-age Porto Novo Member of the Lourinhã Formation, but may be the same as A. fragilis.

Allosaurus material from Portugal was first reported in 1999 on the basis of MHNUL/AND.001, a partial skeleton including a quadrate, vertebrae, ribs, gastralia, chevrons, part of the hips, and hindlimbs.  This specimen was assigned to A. fragilis, but the subsequent discovery of a partial skull and neck (ML 415) near Lourinhã, in the Kimmeridgian-age Porto Novo Member of the Lourinhã Formation, spurred the naming of the new species A. europaeus by Octávio Mateus and colleagues. The species appeared earlier in the Jurassic than A. fragilis and differs from other species of Allosaurus in cranial details. However, more material may show it to be A. fragilis, as originally described.

The issue of species and potential synonyms is complicated by the type specimen of Allosaurus fragilis (catalog number YPM 1930) being extremely fragmentary, consisting of a few incomplete vertebrae, limb bone fragments, rib fragments, and a tooth. Because of this, several scientists have interpreted the type specimen as potentially dubious, and thus the genus Allosaurus itself or at least the species A. fragilis would be a nomen dubium ("dubious name", based on a specimen too incomplete to compare to other specimens or to classify). To address this situation, Gregory S. Paul and Kenneth Carpenter (2010) submitted a petition to the ICZN to have the name "A. fragilis" officially transferred to the more complete specimen USNM4734 (as a neotype).

Synonyms

Creosaurus, Epanterias, and Labrosaurus are regarded as junior synonyms of Allosaurus. Most of the species that are regarded as synonyms of A. fragilis, or that were misassigned to the genus, are obscure and were based on scrappy remains. One exception is Labrosaurus ferox, named in 1884 by Marsh for an oddly formed partial lower jaw, with a prominent gap in the tooth row at the tip of the jaw, and a rear section greatly expanded and turned down. Later researchers suggested that the bone was pathologic, showing an injury to the living animal, and that part of the unusual form of the rear of the bone was due to plaster reconstruction. It is now regarded as an example of A. fragilis.

In his 1988 book, Predatory Dinosaurs of the World, the freelance dinosaurologist Gregory Paul proposed that A. fragilis had tall pointed horns and a slender build compared to a postulated second species A. atrox, and was not a different sex due to rarity. Allosaurus atrox was originally named by Marsh in 1878 as the type species of its own genus, Creosaurus, and is based on YPM 1890, an assortment of bones including a couple of pieces of the skull, portions of nine tail vertebrae, two hip vertebrae, an ilium, and ankle and foot bones. Although the idea of two common Morrison allosaur species was followed in some semi-technical and popular works, the 2000 thesis on Allosauridae noted that Charles Gilmore mistakenly reconstructed USNM 4734 as having a shorter skull than the specimens referred by Paul to atrox, refuting supposed differences between USNM 4734 and putative A. atrox specimens like DINO 2560, AMNH 600, and AMNH 666.

"Allosaurus agilis", seen in Zittel, 1887, and Osborn, 1912, is a typographical error for A. fragilis. "Allosaurus ferox" is a typographical error by Marsh for A. fragilis in a figure caption for the partial skull YPM 1893, and YPM 1893 has been treated as a specimen of A fragilis. Likewise, "Labrosaurus fragilis" is a typographical error by Marsh (1896) for Labrosaurus ferox. "A. whitei" is a nomen nudum coined by Pickering in 1996 for the complete Allosaurus specimens that Paul referred to A. atrox.

"Madsenius" was coined by David Lambert in 1990, for remains from Dinosaur National Monument assigned to Allosaurus or Creosaurus (a synonym of Allosaurus), and was to be described by paleontologist Bob Bakker as "Madsenius trux". However, "Madsenius" is now seen as yet another synonym of Allosaurus because Bakker's action was predicated upon the false assumption of USNM 4734 being distinct from long-snouted Allosaurus due to errors in Gilmore's (1920) reconstruction of USNM 4734.

"Wyomingraptor" was informally coined by Bakker for allosaurid remains from the Morrison Formation of the Late Jurassic. The remains unearthed are labeled as Allosaurus and are housed in the Tate Geological Museum. However, there has been no official description of the remains and "Wyomingraptor" has been dismissed as a nomen nudum, with the remains referable to Allosaurus.

Formerly assigned species and fossils

Several species initially classified within or referred to Allosaurus do not belong within the genus. A. medius was named by Marsh in 1888 for various specimens from the Early Cretaceous Arundel Formation of Maryland, although most of the remains were removed by Richard Swann Lull to the new ornithopod species Dryosaurus grandis, except for a tooth. Gilmore considered the tooth nondiagnostic but transferred it to Dryptosaurus, as D. medius. The referral was not accepted in the most recent review of basal tetanurans, and Allosaurus medius was simply listed as a dubious species of theropod. It may be closely related to Acrocanthosaurus.

Allosaurus valens is a new combination for Antrodemus valens used by Friedrich von Huene in 1932; Antrodemus valens itself may also pertain to Allosaurus fragilis, as Gilmore suggested in 1920.

A. lucaris, another Marsh name, was given to a partial skeleton in 1878. He later decided it warranted its own genus, Labrosaurus, but this has not been accepted, and A. lucaris is also regarded as another specimen of A. fragilis. Allosaurus lucaris, is known mostly from vertebrae, sharing characters with Allosaurus. Paul and Carpenter stated that the type specimen of this species, YPM 1931, was from a younger age than Allosaurus, and might represent a different genus. However, they found that the specimen was undiagnostic, and thus A. lucaris was a nomen dubium.

Allosaurus sibiricus was described in 1914 by A. N. Riabinin on the basis of a bone, later identified as a partial fourth metatarsal, from the Early Cretaceous of Buryatia, Russia. It was transferred to Chilantaisaurus in 1990, but is now considered a nomen dubium indeterminate beyond Theropoda.

Allosaurus meriani was a new combination by George Olshevsky for Megalosaurus meriani Greppin, 1870, based on a tooth from the Late Jurassic of Switzerland. However, a recent overview of Ceratosaurus included it in Ceratosaurus sp.

Apatodon mirus, based on a scrap of vertebra Marsh first thought to be a mammalian jaw, has been listed as a synonym of Allosaurus fragilis. However, it was considered indeterminate beyond Dinosauria by Chure, and Mickey Mortimer believes that the synonymy of Apatodon with Allosaurus was due to correspondence to Ralph Molnar by John McIntosh, whereby the latter reportedly found a paper saying that Othniel Charles Marsh admitted that the Apatodon holotype was actually an allosaurid dorsal vertebra.

A. amplexus was named by Gregory S. Paul for giant Morrison allosaur remains, and included in his conception Saurophagus maximus (later Saurophaganax). A. amplexus was originally coined by Cope in 1878 as the type species of his new genus Epanterias, and is based on what is now AMNH 5767, parts of three vertebrae, a coracoid, and a metatarsal. Following Paul's work, this species has been accepted as a synonym of A. fragilis. A 2010 study by Paul and Kenneth Carpenter, however, indicates that Epanterias is temporally younger than the A. fragilis type specimen, so it is a separate species at minimum.

A. maximus was a new combination by David K. Smith for Chure's Saurophaganax maximus, a taxon created by Chure in 1995 for giant allosaurid remains from the Morrison of Oklahoma.  These remains had been known as Saurophagus, but that name was already in use, leading Chure to propose a substitute. Smith, in his 1998 analysis of variation, concluded that S. maximus was not different enough from Allosaurus to be a separate genus, but did warrant its own species, A. maximus. This reassignment was rejected in a review of basal tetanurans.

There are also several species left over from the synonymizations of Creosaurus and Labrosaurus with Allosaurus. Creosaurus potens was named by Lull in 1911 for a vertebra from the Early Cretaceous of Maryland. It is now regarded as a dubious theropod. Labrosaurus stechowi, described in 1920 by Janensch based on isolated Ceratosaurus-like teeth from the Tendaguru beds of Tanzania, was listed by Donald F. Glut as a species of Allosaurus, is now considered a dubious ceratosaurian related to Ceratosaurus. L. sulcatus, named by Marsh in 1896 for a Morrison theropod tooth, which like L. stechowi is now regarded as a dubious Ceratosaurus-like ceratosaur.

A. tendagurensis was named in 1925 by Werner Janensch for a partial shin (MB.R.3620) found in the Kimmeridgian-age Tendaguru Formation in Mtwara, Tanzania. Although tabulated as a tentatively valid species of Allosaurus in the second edition of the Dinosauria, subsequent studies place it as indeterminate beyond Tetanurae, either a carcharodontosaurian or megalosaurid. Although obscure, it was a large theropod, possibly around 10 meters long (33 ft) and 2.5 metric tons (2.8 short tons) in weight.

Kurzanov and colleagues in 2003 designated six teeth from Siberia as Allosaurus sp. (meaning the authors found the specimens to be most like those of Allosaurus, but did not or could not assign a species to them). They were reclassified as an indeterminate theropod. Also, reports of Allosaurus in Shanxi, China go back to at least 1982. These were interpreted as Torvosaurus remains in 2012.

An astragalus (ankle bone) thought to belong to a species of Allosaurus was found at Cape Paterson, Victoria in Early Cretaceous beds in southeastern Australia. It was thought to provide evidence that Australia was a refugium for animals that had gone extinct elsewhere. This identification was challenged by Samuel Welles, who thought it more resembled that of an ornithomimid, but the original authors defended their identification. With fifteen years of new specimens and research to look at, Daniel Chure reexamined the bone and found that it was not Allosaurus, but could represent an allosauroid. Similarly, Yoichi Azuma and Phil Currie, in their description of Fukuiraptor, noted that the bone closely resembled that of their new genus. This specimen is sometimes referred to as "Allosaurus robustus", an informal museum name. It may have belonged to something similar to, or the same as, Australovenator, or it may represent an abelisaur.

Description

Allosaurus was a typical large theropod, having a massive skull on a short neck, a long, slightly sloping tail, and reduced forelimbs. John Foster, a specialist on the Morrison Formation, suggests that  is reasonable for large adults of A. fragilis, but that  is a closer estimate for individuals represented by the average-sized thigh bones he has measured.

Several gigantic specimens have been attributed to Allosaurus, but may in fact belong to other genera. The closely related genus Saurophaganax (OMNH 1708) reached perhaps  in length, and its single species has sometimes been included in the genus Allosaurus as Allosaurus maximus, though recent studies support it as a separate genus. Another potential specimen of Allosaurus, once assigned to the genus Epanterias (AMNH 5767), may have measured  in length. A more recent discovery is a partial skeleton from the Peterson Quarry in Morrison rocks of New Mexico; this large allosaurid may be another individual of Saurophaganax.

David K. Smith, examining Allosaurus fossils by quarry, found that the Cleveland-Lloyd Dinosaur Quarry (Utah) specimens are generally smaller than those from Como Bluff (Wyoming) or Brigham Young University's Dry Mesa Quarry (Colorado), but the shapes of the bones themselves did not vary between the sites. A later study by Smith incorporating Garden Park (Colorado) and Dinosaur National Monument (Utah) specimens found no justification for multiple species based on skeletal variation; skull variation was most common and was gradational, suggesting individual variation was responsible. Further work on size-related variation again found no consistent differences, although the Dry Mesa material tended to clump together on the basis of the astragalus, an ankle bone. Kenneth Carpenter, using skull elements from the Cleveland-Lloyd site, found wide variation between individuals, calling into question previous species-level distinctions based on such features as the shape of the horns, and the proposed differentiation of A. jimmadseni based on the shape of the jugal. A study published by Motani et al., in 2020 suggests that Allosaurus was also sexually dimorphic in the width of the femur's head against its length.

Skull

The skull and teeth of Allosaurus were modestly proportioned for a theropod of its size. Each premaxilla (the bones that formed the tip of the snout) held five teeth with D-shaped cross-sections, and each maxilla (the main tooth-bearing bones in the upper jaw) had between 14 and 17 teeth; the number of teeth does not exactly correspond to the size of the bone. Each dentary (the tooth-bearing bone of the lower jaw) had between 14 and 17 teeth, with an average count of 16. The teeth became shorter, narrower, and more curved toward the back of the skull. All of the teeth had saw-like edges. They were shed easily, and were replaced continually, making them common fossils. Its skull was light, robust and equipped with dozens of sharp, serrated teeth. 

The skull had a pair of horns above and in front of the eyes. These horns were composed of extensions of the lacrimal bones, and varied in shape and size. There were also lower paired ridges running along the top edges of the nasal bones that led into the horns. The horns were probably covered in a keratin sheath and may have had a variety of functions, including acting as sunshades for the eyes, being used for display, and being used in combat against other members of the same species (although they were fragile). There was a ridge along the back of the skull roof for muscle attachment, as is also seen in tyrannosaurids.

Inside the lacrimal bones were depressions that may have held glands, such as salt glands. Within the maxillae were sinuses that were better developed than those of more basal theropods such as Ceratosaurus and Marshosaurus; they may have been related to the sense of smell, perhaps holding something like Jacobson's organs. The roof of the braincase was thin, perhaps to improve thermoregulation for the brain. The skull and lower jaws had joints that permitted motion within these units. In the lower jaws, the bones of the front and back halves loosely articulated, permitting the jaws to bow outward and increasing the animal's gape. The braincase and frontals may also have had a joint.

Postcranial skeleton

Allosaurus had nine vertebrae in the neck, 14 in the back, and five in the sacrum supporting the hips. The number of tail vertebrae is unknown and varied with individual size; James Madsen estimated about 50, while Gregory S. Paul considered that to be too many and suggested 45 or less. There were hollow spaces in the neck and anterior back vertebrae. Such spaces, which are also found in modern theropods (that is, the birds), are interpreted as having held air sacs used in respiration. The rib cage was broad, giving it a barrel chest, especially in comparison to less derived theropods like Ceratosaurus. Allosaurus had gastralia (belly ribs), but these are not common findings, and they may have ossified poorly. In one published case, the gastralia show evidence of injury during life. A furcula (wishbone) was also present, but has only been recognized since 1996; in some cases furculae were confused with gastralia. The ilium, the main hip bone, was massive, and the pubic bone had a prominent foot that may have been used for both muscle attachment and as a prop for resting the body on the ground. Madsen noted that in about half of the individuals from the Cleveland-Lloyd Dinosaur Quarry, independent of size, the pubes had not fused to each other at their foot ends. He suggested that this was a sexual characteristic, with females lacking fused bones to make egg-laying easier. This proposal has not attracted further attention, however.

The forelimbs of Allosaurus were short in comparison to the hindlimbs (only about 35% the length of the hindlimbs in adults) and had three fingers per hand, tipped with large, strongly curved and pointed claws. The arms were powerful, and the forearm was somewhat shorter than the upper arm (1:1.2 ulna/humerus ratio). The wrist had a version of the semilunate carpal also found in more derived theropods like maniraptorans. Of the three fingers, the innermost (or thumb) was the largest, and diverged from the others. The phalangeal formula is 2-3-4-0-0, meaning that the innermost finger (phalange) has two bones, the next has three, and the third finger has four. The legs were not as long or suited for speed as those of tyrannosaurids, and the claws of the toes were less developed and more hoof-like than those of earlier theropods. Each foot had three weight-bearing toes and an inner dewclaw, which Madsen suggested could have been used for grasping in juveniles. There was also what is interpreted as the splint-like remnant of a fifth (outermost) metatarsal, perhaps used as a lever between the Achilles tendon and foot.

Skin 
Skin impressions from Allosaurus have been described. One impression, from a juvenile specimen, measures 30 cm² and is associated with the anterior dorsal ribs/pectoral region. The impression show small scales measuring 1-3 mm in diameter. A large skin impression from the "Big Al Two" specimen, associated with the base of the tail, measures 20 cm x 20 cm, and show large scales measuring up to 2 cm in diameter. However it has been noted that these scales are more similar to those of sauropods, and due to the presence of non-theropod remains associated with the tail of "Big Al Two" there is a possibility that this skin impression is not from Allosaurus.

Another Allosaurus fossil feature a skin impression from the mandible, showing scales measuring 1-2 mm in diameter. The same fossil also preserves skin impressions from the ventral side of the neck, showing broad scutes. A small skin impression from an Allosaurus skull has been reported, but never described.

Classification
Allosaurus was an allosaurid, a member of a family of large theropods within the larger group Carnosauria. The family name Allosauridae was created for this genus in 1878 by Othniel Charles Marsh, but the term was largely unused until the 1970s in favor of Megalosauridae, another family of large theropods that eventually became a wastebasket taxon. This, along with the use of Antrodemus for Allosaurus during the same period, is a point that needs to be remembered when searching for information on Allosaurus in publications that predate James Madsen's 1976 monograph. Major publications using the name "Megalosauridae" instead of "Allosauridae" include Gilmore, 1920, von Huene, 1926, Romer, 1956 and 1966, Steel, 1970, and Walker, 1964.

Following the publication of Madsen's influential monograph, Allosauridae became the preferred family assignment, but it too was not strongly defined. Semi-technical works used Allosauridae for a variety of large theropods, usually those that were larger and better-known than megalosaurids. Typical theropods that were thought to be related to Allosaurus included Indosaurus, Piatnitzkysaurus, Piveteausaurus, Yangchuanosaurus, Acrocanthosaurus, Chilantaisaurus, Compsosuchus, Stokesosaurus, and Szechuanosaurus. Given modern knowledge of theropod diversity and the advent of cladistic study of evolutionary relationships, none of these theropods is now recognized as an allosaurid, although several, like Acrocanthosaurus and Yangchuanosaurus, are members of closely related families.

Below is a cladogram based on the analysis of Benson et al. in 2010.

Allosauridae is one of four families in Allosauroidea; the other three are Neovenatoridae, Carcharodontosauridae and Sinraptoridae. Allosauridae has at times been proposed as ancestral to the Tyrannosauridae (which would make it paraphyletic), one example being Gregory S. Paul's Predatory Dinosaurs of the World, but this has been rejected, with tyrannosaurids identified as members of a separate branch of theropods, the Coelurosauria. Allosauridae is the smallest of the carnosaur families, with only Saurophaganax and a currently unnamed French allosauroid accepted as possible valid genera besides Allosaurus in the most recent review. Another genus, Epanterias, is a potential valid member, but it and Saurophaganax may turn out to be large examples of Allosaurus. Recent reviews have kept the genus Saurophaganax and included Epanterias with Allosaurus.

Paleobiology

Life history

The wealth of Allosaurus fossils, from nearly all ages of individuals, allows scientists to study how the animal grew and how long its lifespan may have been. Remains may reach as far back in the lifespan as eggs—crushed eggs from Colorado have been suggested as those of Allosaurus. Based on histological analysis of limb bones, bone deposition appears to stop at around 22 to 28 years, which is comparable to that of other large theropods like Tyrannosaurus. From the same analysis, its maximum growth appears to have been at age 15, with an estimated growth rate of about 150 kilograms (330 lb) per year.

Medullary bone tissue (endosteally derived, ephemeral, mineralization located inside the medulla of the long bones in gravid female birds) has been reported in at least one Allosaurus specimen, a shin bone from the Cleveland-Lloyd Quarry. Today, this bone tissue is only formed in female birds that are laying eggs, as it is used to supply calcium to shells. Its presence in the Allosaurus individual has been used to establish sex and show it had reached reproductive age. However, other studies have called into question some cases of medullary bone in dinosaurs, including this Allosaurus individual. Data from extant birds suggested that the medullary bone in this Allosaurus individual may have been the result of a bone pathology instead. However, with the confirmation of medullary tissue indicating sex in a specimen of Tyrannosaurus, it may be possible to ascertain whether or not the Allosaurus in question was indeed female.
 
The discovery of a juvenile specimen with a nearly complete hindlimb shows that the legs were relatively longer in juveniles, and the lower segments of the leg (shin and foot) were relatively longer than the thigh. These differences suggest that younger Allosaurus were faster and had different hunting strategies than adults, perhaps chasing small prey as juveniles, then becoming ambush hunters of large prey upon adulthood. The thigh bone became thicker and wider during growth, and the cross-section less circular, as muscle attachments shifted, muscles became shorter, and the growth of the leg slowed. These changes imply that juvenile legs has less predictable stresses compared with adults, which would have moved with more regular forward progression. Conversely, the skull bones appear to have generally grown isometrically, increasing in size without changing in proportion.

Feeding

Many paleontologists accept Allosaurus as an active predator of large animals. There is dramatic evidence for allosaur attacks on Stegosaurus, including an Allosaurus tail vertebra with a partially healed puncture wound that fits a Stegosaurus tail spike, and a Stegosaurus neck plate with a U-shaped wound that correlates well with an Allosaurus snout. Sauropods seem to be likely candidates as both live prey and as objects of scavenging, based on the presence of scrapings on sauropod bones fitting allosaur teeth well and the presence of shed allosaur teeth with sauropod bones. However, as Gregory Paul noted in 1988, Allosaurus was probably not a predator of fully grown sauropods, unless it hunted in packs, as it had a modestly sized skull and relatively small teeth, and was greatly outweighed by contemporaneous sauropods. Another possibility is that it preferred to hunt juveniles instead of fully grown adults. Research in the 1990s and the first decade of the 21st century may have found other solutions to this question. Robert T. Bakker, comparing Allosaurus to Cenozoic saber-toothed carnivorous mammals, found similar adaptations, such as a reduction of jaw muscles and increase in neck muscles, and the ability to open the jaws extremely wide. Although Allosaurus did not have saber teeth, Bakker suggested another mode of attack that would have used such neck and jaw adaptations: the short teeth in effect became small serrations on a saw-like cutting edge running the length of the upper jaw, which would have been driven into prey. This type of jaw would permit slashing attacks against much larger prey, with the goal of weakening the victim.

Similar conclusions were drawn by another study using finite element analysis on an Allosaurus skull. According to their biomechanical analysis, the skull was very strong but had a relatively small bite force. By using jaw muscles only, it could produce a bite force of 805 to 8,724 N, but the skull could withstand nearly 55,500 N of vertical force against the tooth row. The authors suggested that Allosaurus used its skull like a machete against prey, attacking open-mouthed, slashing flesh with its teeth, and tearing it away without splintering bones, unlike Tyrannosaurus, which is thought to have been capable of damaging bones. They also suggested that the architecture of the skull could have permitted the use of different strategies against different prey; the skull was light enough to allow attacks on smaller and more agile ornithopods, but strong enough for high-impact ambush attacks against larger prey like stegosaurids and sauropods. Their interpretations were challenged by other researchers, who found no modern analogues to a hatchet attack and considered it more likely that the skull was strong to compensate for its open construction when absorbing the stresses from struggling prey. The original authors noted that Allosaurus itself has no modern equivalent, that the tooth row is well-suited to such an attack, and that articulations in the skull cited by their detractors as problematic actually helped protect the palate and lessen stress. Another possibility for handling large prey is that theropods like Allosaurus were "flesh grazers" which could take bites of flesh out of living sauropods that were sufficient to sustain the predator so it would not have needed to expend the effort to kill the prey outright. This strategy would also potentially have allowed the prey to recover and be fed upon in a similar way later. An additional suggestion notes that ornithopods were the most common available dinosaurian prey, and that allosaurs may have subdued them by using an attack similar to that of modern big cats: grasping the prey with their forelimbs, and then making multiple bites on the throat to crush the trachea. This is compatible with other evidence that the forelimbs were strong and capable of restraining prey. Studies done by Stephen Lautenschager et al. from the University of Bristol also indicate Allosaurus could open its jaws quite wide and sustain considerable muscle force. When compared with Tyrannosaurus and the therizinosaurid Erlikosaurus in the same study, it was found that Allosaurus had a wider gape than either; the animal was capable of opening its jaws to a 92-degree angle at maximum. The findings also indicate that large carnivorous dinosaurs, like modern carnivores, had wider jaw gapes than herbivores.

A biomechanical study published in 2013 by Eric Snively and colleagues found that Allosaurus had an unusually low attachment point on the skull for the longissimus capitis superficialis neck muscle compared to other theropods such as Tyrannosaurus. This would have allowed the animal to make rapid and forceful vertical movements with the skull. The authors found that vertical strikes as proposed by Bakker and Rayfield are consistent with the animal's capabilities. They also found that the animal probably processed carcasses by vertical movements in a similar manner to falcons, such as kestrels: the animal could have gripped prey with the skull and feet, then pulled back and up to remove flesh. This differs from the prey-handling envisioned for tyrannosaurids, which probably tore flesh with lateral shakes of the skull, similar to crocodilians. In addition, Allosaurus was able to "move its head and neck around relatively rapidly and with considerable control", at the cost of power.

Other aspects of feeding include the eyes, arms, and legs. The shape of the skull of Allosaurus limited potential binocular vision to 20° of width, slightly less than that of modern crocodilians. As with crocodilians, this may have been enough to judge prey distance and time attacks. The arms, compared with those of other theropods, were suited for both grasping prey at a distance or clutching it close, and the articulation of the claws suggests that they could have been used to hook things. Finally, the top speed of Allosaurus has been estimated at 30 to 55 kilometers per hour (19 to 34 miles per hour).

A paper on the cranio-dental morphology of Allosaurus and how it worked has deemed the hatchet jaw attack unlikely, reinterpreting the unusually wide gape as an adaptation to allow Allosaurus to deliver a muscle-driven bite to large prey, with the weaker jaw muscles being a trade-off to allow for the widened gape.

Social behavior

It has been speculated since the 1970s that Allosaurus preyed on sauropods and other large dinosaurs by hunting in groups.
Such a depiction is common in semitechnical and popular dinosaur literature. Robert T. Bakker has extended social behavior to parental care, and has interpreted shed allosaur teeth and chewed bones of large prey animals as evidence that adult allosaurs brought food to lairs for their young to eat until they were grown, and prevented other carnivores from scavenging on the food. However, there is actually little evidence of gregarious behavior in theropods, and social interactions with members of the same species would have included antagonistic encounters, as shown by injuries to gastralia and bite wounds to skulls (the pathologic lower jaw named Labrosaurus ferox is one such possible example). Such head-biting may have been a way to establish dominance in a pack or to settle territorial disputes.

Although Allosaurus may have hunted in packs, it has been argued that Allosaurus and other theropods had largely aggressive interactions instead of cooperative interactions with other members of their own species. The study in question noted that cooperative hunting of prey much larger than an individual predator, as is commonly inferred for theropod dinosaurs, is rare among vertebrates in general, and modern diapsid carnivores (including lizards, crocodiles, and birds) rarely cooperate to hunt in such a way. Instead, they are typically territorial and will kill and cannibalize intruders of the same species, and will also do the same to smaller individuals that attempt to eat before they do when aggregated at feeding sites. According to this interpretation, the accumulation of remains of multiple Allosaurus individuals at the same site; e.g., in the Cleveland–Lloyd Quarry, are not due to pack hunting, but to the fact that Allosaurus individuals were drawn together to feed on other disabled or dead allosaurs, and were sometimes killed in the process. This could explain the high proportion of juvenile and subadult allosaurs present, as juveniles and subadults are disproportionally killed at modern group feeding sites of animals like crocodiles and Komodo dragons. The same interpretation applies to Bakker's lair sites. There is some evidence for cannibalism in Allosaurus, including Allosaurus shed teeth found among rib fragments, possible tooth marks on a shoulder blade, and cannibalized allosaur skeletons among the bones at Bakker's lair sites.

Brain and senses

The brain of Allosaurus, as interpreted from spiral CT scanning of an endocast, was more consistent with crocodilian brains than those of the other living archosaurs, birds. The structure of the vestibular apparatus indicates that the skull was held nearly horizontal, as opposed to strongly tipped up or down. The structure of the inner ear was like that of a crocodilian, and so Allosaurus probably could have heard lower frequencies best, and would have had trouble with subtle sounds. The olfactory bulbs were large and seem to have been well suited for detecting odors, although the area for evaluating smells was relatively small.

Paleopathology

In 2001, Bruce Rothschild and others published a study examining evidence for stress fractures and tendon avulsions in theropod dinosaurs and the implications for their behavior. Since stress fractures are caused by repeated trauma rather than singular events they are more likely to be caused by the behavior of the animal than other kinds of injury. Stress fractures and tendon avulsions occurring in the forelimb have special behavioral significance since while injuries to the feet could be caused by running or migration, resistant prey items are the most probable source of injuries to the hand. Allosaurus was one of only two theropods examined in the study to exhibit a tendon avulsion, and in both cases the avulsion occurred on the forelimb. When the researchers looked for stress fractures, they found that Allosaurus had a significantly greater number of stress fractures than Albertosaurus, Ornithomimus or Archaeornithomimus. Of the 47 hand bones the researchers studied, three were found to contain stress fractures. Of the feet, 281 bones were studied and 17 were found to have stress fractures. The stress fractures in the foot bones "were distributed to the proximal phalanges" and occurred across all three weight-bearing toes in "statistically indistinguishable" numbers. Since the lower end of the third metatarsal would have contacted the ground first while an allosaur was running, it would have borne the most stress. If the allosaurs' stress fractures were caused by damage accumulating while walking or running this bone should have experience more stress fractures than the others. The lack of such a bias in the examined Allosaurus fossils indicates an origin for the stress fractures from a source other than running. The authors conclude that these fractures occurred during interaction with prey, like an allosaur trying to hold struggling prey with its feet. The abundance of stress fractures and avulsion injuries in Allosaurus provide evidence for "very active" predation-based rather than scavenging diets.

The left scapula and fibula of an Allosaurus fragilis specimen catalogued as USNM 4734 are both pathological, both probably due to healed fractures. The specimen USNM 8367 preserved several pathological gastralia which preserve evidence of healed fractures near their middle. Some of the fractures were poorly healed and "formed pseudoarthroses". A specimen with a fractured rib was recovered from the Cleveland-Lloyd Quarry. Another specimen had fractured ribs and fused vertebrae near the end of the tail. An apparent subadult male Allosaurus fragilis was reported to have extensive pathologies, with a total of fourteen separate injuries. The specimen MOR 693 had pathologies on five ribs, the sixth neck vertebra, the third, eighth, and thirteenth back vertebrae, the second tail vertebra and its chevron, the gastralia right scapula, manual phalanx I left ilium metatarsals III and V, the first phalanx of the third toe and the third phalanx of the second. The ilium had "a large hole...caused by a blow from above". The near end of the first phalanx of the third toe was afflicted by an involucrum.

Other pathologies reported in Allosaurus include:
 Willow breaks in two ribs
 Healed fractures in the humerus and radius
 Distortion of joint surfaces in the foot, possibly due to osteoarthritis or developmental issues
 Osteopetrosis along the endosteal surface of a tibia.
 Distortions of the joint surfaces of the tail vertebrae, possibly due to osetoarthritis or developmental issues
 "[E]xtensive 'neoplastic' ankylosis of caudals", possibly due to physical trauma, as well as the fusion of chevrons to centra
 Coossification of vertebral centra near the end of the tail
 Amputation of a chevron and foot bone, both possibly a result of bites
 "[E]xtensive exostoses" in the first phalanx of the third toe
 Lesions similar to those caused by osteomyelitis in two scapulae
 Bone spurs in a premaxilla, ungual, and two metacarpals
 Exostosis in a pedal phalanx possibly attributable to an infectious disease
 A metacarpal with a round depressed fracture

Paleoecology

Allosaurus was the most common large theropod in the vast tract of Western American fossil-bearing rock known as the Morrison Formation, accounting for 70 to 75% of theropod specimens, and as such was at the top trophic level of the Morrison food chain. The Morrison Formation is interpreted as a semiarid environment with distinct wet and dry seasons, and flat floodplains. Vegetation varied from river-lining forests of conifers, tree ferns, and ferns (gallery forests), to fern savannas with occasional trees such as the Araucaria-like conifer Brachyphyllum.

The Morrison Formation has been a rich fossil hunting ground. The flora of the period has been revealed by fossils of green algae, fungi, mosses, horsetails, ferns, cycads, ginkgoes, and several families of conifers. Animal fossils discovered include bivalves, snails, ray-finned fishes, frogs, salamanders, turtles, sphenodonts, lizards, terrestrial and aquatic crocodylomorphs, several species of pterosaur, numerous dinosaur species, and early mammals such as docodonts, multituberculates, symmetrodonts, and triconodonts. Dinosaurs known from the Morrison include the theropods Ceratosaurus, Ornitholestes, Tanycolagreus, and Torvosaurus, the sauropods Haplocanthosaurus, Camarasaurus, Cathetosaurus, Brachiosaurus, Suuwassea, Apatosaurus, Brontosaurus, Barosaurus, Diplodocus, Supersaurus, Amphicoelias, and Maraapunisaurus, and the ornithischians Camptosaurus, Dryosaurus, and Stegosaurus. Allosaurus is commonly found at the same sites as Apatosaurus, Camarasaurus, Diplodocus, and Stegosaurus. The Late Jurassic formations of Portugal where Allosaurus is present are interpreted as having been similar to the Morrison, but with a stronger marine influence. Many of the dinosaurs of the Morrison Formation are the same genera as those seen in Portuguese rocks (mainly Allosaurus, Ceratosaurus, Torvosaurus, and Stegosaurus), or have a close counterpart (Brachiosaurus and Lusotitan, Camptosaurus and Draconyx).

Allosaurus coexisted with fellow large theropods Ceratosaurus and Torvosaurus in both the United States and Portugal. The three appear to have had different ecological niches, based on anatomy and the location of fossils. Ceratosaurus and Torvosaurus may have preferred to be active around waterways, and had lower, thinner bodies that would have given them an advantage in forest and underbrush terrains, whereas Allosaurus was more compact, with longer legs, faster but less maneuverable, and seems to have preferred dry floodplains. Ceratosaurus, better known than Torvosaurus, differed noticeably from Allosaurus in functional anatomy by having a taller, narrower skull with large, broad teeth. Allosaurus was itself a potential food item to other carnivores, as illustrated by an Allosaurus pubic foot marked by the teeth of another theropod, probably Ceratosaurus or Torvosaurus. The location of the bone in the body (along the bottom margin of the torso and partially shielded by the legs), and the fact that it was among the most massive in the skeleton, indicates that the Allosaurus was being scavenged.
A bone assemblage in the Upper Jurassic Mygatt-Moore Quarry preserves an unusually high occurrence of theropod bite marks, most of which can be attributed to Allosaurus and Ceratosaurus, while others could have been made by Saurophaganax or Torvosaurus given the size of the striations. While the position of the bite marks on the herbivorous dinosaurs is consistent with predation or early access to remains, bite marks found on Allosaurus material suggest scavenging, either from the other theropods or from another Allosaurus. The unusually high concentration of theropod bite marks compared to other assemblages could be explained either by a more complete utilization of resources during a dry season by theropods, or by a collecting bias in other localities.

References

External links

 Specimens, discussion, and references pertaining to Allosaurus fragilis at The Theropod Database
 Utah State Fossil, Allosaurus , from Pioneer: Utah's Online Library
 Restoration of MOR 693 ("Big Al") and muscle and organ restoration at Scott Hartman's Skeletal Drawing website
 List of the many possible Allosaurus species... 

 
Late Jurassic genus first appearances
Late Jurassic genus extinctions
Late Jurassic dinosaurs of Europe
Jurassic Portugal
Fossils of Portugal
Lourinhã Formation
Late Jurassic dinosaurs of North America
Dinosaurs of the Morrison Formation
Paleontology in Colorado
Paleontology in Wyoming
Paleontology in Utah
Fossil taxa described in 1877
Taxa named by Othniel Charles Marsh
Apex predators